Callia flavipes is a species of beetle in the family Cerambycidae. It was described by Zajciw in 1958. It is known from Brazil.

References

Calliini
Beetles described in 1958